Zdeněk Procházka (born 10 October 1960) is a retired Czech footballer who played as a forward.

External links
 

1960 births
Living people
Czech footballers
Association football forwards
SK Dynamo České Budějovice players
AC Sparta Prague players
Omonia Aradippou players
SK Dynamo České Budějovice managers
Czech football managers